The Association of Pennsylvania State College and University Faculties (APSCUF) is the bargaining unit representing faculty and coaches at the 14 universities (formerly colleges) of the Pennsylvania State System of Higher Education (PASSHE). APSCUF was founded in 1937 as a professional association. It became the bargaining unit representing faculty in 1973. In 2000, APSCUF became the legal representative for the coaches at the 14 universities through a collective bargaining agreement.

APSCUF represents faculty and coaches at: 
Bloomsburg University of Pennsylvania
California University of Pennsylvania
Cheyney University of Pennsylvania
Clarion University of Pennsylvania
East Stroudsburg University of Pennsylvania
Edinboro University of Pennsylvania
Indiana University of Pennsylvania
Kutztown University of Pennsylvania
Lock Haven University of Pennsylvania
Mansfield University of Pennsylvania
Millersville University of Pennsylvania
Shippensburg University of Pennsylvania
Slippery Rock University of Pennsylvania
West Chester University of Pennsylvania
In October 2016, the Association of Pennsylvania State College and University Faculties went on strike for the first time when negotiations between union and state representatives fell through. Thousands of university faculty members in Pennsylvania participated in the strike, which lasted Oct. 19–21.

References

External links
Official website

Tertiary education trade unions
Trade unions in Pennsylvania
Education in Pennsylvania
Education-related professional associations
Trade unions established in 1937
State wide trade unions in the United States